Hell's Half Acre is a low budget direct-to-video horror film directed by Sean Tiedeman and Scott Krycia.  The film was shot over the course of five years in Allentown, Pennsylvania. Tiedeman and Krycia shot Hell's Half Acre on MiniDV for a modest budget. The duo planned everything from elaborate massacre sequences to the burning of an actual full-size house.

Plot
A serial killer is brought to justice by his victims and burned alive on what is now known as Hell's Half Acre.  Years later, a faceless killer begins slaughtering the townspeople.  Losing her friends and family, Nicole Becker (Tesia Nicoli) decides to go after the killer with all she has got.  Double machetes, shotguns, dual handguns, and even a chain gun are all part of this killer's arsenal.

Cast
 Tesia Nicoli as Nicole Becker
 Ken Scwhwaz as Detective Lapetta
 Todd Labar as The Killer
 Jim Clauser as WDIE Radio Host
 Bob Weick as Bob Moore

Release
Hell's Half Acre premiered theatrically on Saturday, October 27, 2007 at the Full Moon Film Festival in Little Rock, Arkansas.
On Friday, March 13, 2009 Hell's Half Acre was shown as part of the Severed Sinema film series.  The event was held at the Sherman Theater in Stroudsburg, Pennsylvania.

External links
 Horrornews.net Film Review: Hell's Half Acre (2006)
 Hell's Half Acre official movie site
 Hell's Half Acre myspace page
 .
 THE ALLENTOWN TIMES Cover Story
 FANGORIA.COM article
 Hell's Half Acre review from SYNERGY MAGAZINE
 MANIA.COM movie review
 POCONO RECORD Hell's Half Acre/Sherman Theater article

References

2006 direct-to-video films
2006 horror films
2006 films